Jackson Township is a township in Cambria County, Pennsylvania, United States. The population was 4,392 at the 2010 census, down from 4,925 at the 2000 census. It is part of the Johnstown, Pennsylvania Metropolitan Statistical Area.

Geography
Jackson Township is located on the west side of Cambria County; the western border of the township is the border with Indiana County. The northern border of the township follows the South Branch of Blacklick Creek, a westward-flowing tributary of the Conemaugh River. The boroughs of Nanty Glo and Vintondale are in the valley of the South Branch and abut Jackson Township but are separate from it. The unincorporated communities of Mundys Corner and Vinco are in the eastern part of the township.

Pennsylvania Route 271 leads north into Nanty Glo and south  to Johnstown.

Communities

Census-designated places
Census-designated places are geographical areas designated by the U.S. Census Bureau for the purposes of compiling demographic data. They are not actual jurisdictions under Pennsylvania law. Other unincorporated communities, such as villages, may be listed here as well.

 Vinco
 Mundys Corner

Unincorporated communities

 Chickaree
 Dearmin
 Fairview

Demographics

As of the census of 2000, there were 4,925 people, 1,940 households, and 1,468 families residing in the township.  The population density was 101.9 people per square mile (39.3/km).  There were 2,025 housing units at an average density of 41.9/sq mi (16.2/km).  The racial makeup of the township was 99.31% White, 0.04% African American, 0.02% Native American, 0.08% Asian, 0.04% from other races, and 0.51% from two or more races. Hispanic or Latino of any race were 0.10% of the population.

There were 1,940 households, out of which 30.1% had children under the age of 18 living with them, 64.7% were married couples living together, 8.1% had a female householder with no husband present, and 24.3% were non-families. 21.1% of all households were made up of individuals, and 11.1% had someone living alone who was 65 years of age or older.  The average household size was 2.52 and the average family size was 2.92.

In the township the population was spread out, with 21.6% under the age of 18, 7.3% from 18 to 24, 26.4% from 25 to 44, 27.5% from 45 to 64, and 17.2% who were 65 years of age or older.  The median age was 42 years. For every 100 females, there were 97.6 males.  For every 100 females age 18 and over, there were 94.5 males.

The median income for a household in the township was $34,747, and the median income for a family was $40,400. Males had a median income of $31,706 versus $22,660 for females. The per capita income for the township was $15,790.  About 3.2% of families and 6.2% of the population were below the poverty line, including 7.4% of those under age 18 and 8.1% of those age 65 or over.

References

External links
Jackson Township official website
Jackson Township at Nantyglo.com

Populated places established in 1828
Townships in Cambria County, Pennsylvania
Townships in Pennsylvania